Mon is a village and a former municipality in the district of Albula in the canton of Graubünden in Switzerland. On 1 January 2015 the former municipalities of Alvaschein, Mon, Stierva, Tiefencastel, Alvaneu, Brienz/Brinzauls and Surava merged to form the new municipality of Albula/Alvra.

History
Mon is first mentioned around 1001-1200 as de Maune. In 1281 it was mentioned as Mans. Until 1943 Mon was known as Mons.

Geography

Of this area, 36.7% is used for agricultural purposes, while 58.8% is forested. Of the rest of the land, 1.9% is settled (buildings or roads) and the remainder (2.7%) is non-productive (rivers, glaciers or mountains).

The municipality is located in the Alvaschein sub-district of the Albula district. It is southwest of Tiefencastel on the left hand slope of the Oberhalbstein Range.

Demographics
Mon had a population (as of 2013) of 90. , 5.6% of the population was made up of foreign nationals. Over the last 10 years the population has grown at a rate of 7.1%. Most of the population speaks Rhaeto-Romance (52.3%), with German being second most common (45.3%) and Italian being third ( 1.2%).

, the gender distribution of the population was 46.7% male and 53.3% female. The age distribution, in Mon is; 13 people or 15.1% of the population are between 0 and 9 years old. 8 people or 9.3% are 10 to 14, and 1 people or 1.2% are 15 to 19. Of the adult population, 5 people or 5.8% of the population are between 20 and 29 years old. 11 people or 12.8% are 30 to 39, 17 people or 19.8% are 40 to 49, and 9 people or 10.5% are 50 to 59. The senior population distribution is 11 people or 12.8% of the population are between 60 and 69 years old, 9 people or 10.5% are 70 to 79, there are 2 people or 2.3% who are 80 to 89.

In the 2007 federal election the most popular party was the CVP which received 56.1% of the vote. The next three most popular parties were the SPS (24.3%), the SVP (13.8%) and the FDP (5.9%).

In Mon about 79.5% of the population (between age 25-64) have completed either non-mandatory upper secondary education or additional higher education (either university or a Fachhochschule).

Mon has an unemployment rate of 0.66%. , there were 19 people employed in the primary economic sector and about 9 businesses involved in this sector. 2 people are employed in the secondary sector and there is 1 business in this sector. 11 people are employed in the tertiary sector, with 4 businesses in this sector.

The historical population is given in the following table:

Heritage sites of national significance
The baroque Church of St. Franziskus/S. Francestg is listed as a Swiss heritage sites of national significance. The Capuchin built church dates from 1643-48. The frescoes were finished by Johann Rudolf Sturn, but in 1915 were partially painted over. However, following the renovation in 1975, the original frescoes are once again visible.

References

External links

Albula/Alvra
Former municipalities of Graubünden
Cultural property of national significance in Graubünden